Seoul Museum of History is a history museum located in Sinmunno 1 ga, Jongno-gu, Seoul, South Korea.

Seoul was the capital of the Joseon Dynasty, and the Museum depicts the evolution from its prehistoric period to the city it is today. It illustrates the history of Seoul and hosts special exhibitions, such as Panoramic Prague.

Exhibitions
 Panoramic Prague
 Romance of the Three Kingdoms in Korea - November 2008

See also
History of Seoul
History of Korea
List of museums in Seoul
List of museums in South Korea

References

Jongno District
Museums in Seoul
History museums in South Korea
2002 establishments in South Korea
Museums established in 2002